Ezycom (EzyBBS) is a shareware bulletin board system (BBS) application first introduced for MS-DOS by Peter Davies.  It is still in active development and currently being developed by Stephen Gibbs and the Ezycom Development Team.  The current version of Ezycom is v2.15g2, which was released on 21 April 2010.  A minor update was released on 21 May 2010.

Features
Ezycom supports several features that make it "easy" to use (hence the name) including: multinode operation (up to 255 nodes depending on license type), network and multitasker support, Fidonet-compatible message base, built-in echomail and netmail tossers, built-in file transfer protocols and QWK/Blue Wave offline mail support (including offline netmail support).  Ezycom is being used with the DOS, Windows, OS/2, eComStation and ArcaOS operating systems with success.  It has also been proven to work under Linux using the Dosemu emulation software.

History
Peter Davies originally developed Ezycom BBS as part of his master's degree dissertation in 1990.  Due to lack of time to devote to Ezycom's development, Peter handed over the development reins to Stephen Gibbs in 1997.  The next official release of Ezycom was v2.00 in 2003, which included several Y2K bug fixes.  Stephen has since done all Ezycom development.  The latest release was v2.15g2, in May 2010.

References

External links
 EzyCom former websiteThis shut down in 2017, and now serves as a clock. 
 Ezycom third-party utilities and support files at thebbs.org
 Ezycom's page at the BBS Documentary site, part of BBS history

Bulletin board system software
DOS software